The 1970 Akron Zips football team represented Akron University in the 1970 NCAA College Division football season as an independent. Led by 10th-year head coach Gordon K. Larson, the Zips played their home games at the Rubber Bowl in Akron, Ohio. They finished the season with a record of 7–3 and outscored their opponents 259–92.

Schedule

References

Akron
Akron Zips football seasons
Akron Zips football